James Thomson (13 February 1940 – 21 September 2022) was a Scottish cricketer.

Thomson was born in February 1940 at Kilmarnock. A club cricketer for Kilmarnock, Thomson made his debut for Scotland in first-class cricket against Ireland at Greenock in 1962. There followed a gap of 22 years before his next appearance in first-class cricket for Scotland, which came against Ireland at Glasgow in 1984; this is the 15th longest gap between first-class appearances in the history of first-class cricket. He made a third and final first-class appearance, also against Ireland, the following year at Dublin. 

Considered to be Scotland's premium slow left-arm bowler, he took seven wickets in his three first-class matches at an average of 42.42, with best figures of 4 for 116. Thomson made two appearances for Scotland in List A one-day cricket in the 1985 Benson & Hedges Cup against Derbyshire at Aberdeen and Nottinghamshire at Glasgow.

References

External links
 

1940 births
2022 deaths
Sportspeople from Kilmarnock
Scottish cricketers